The South American Basketball Championship 1958 was the 17th edition of this tournament.  It was held from January 24 to February 11 in Santiago, Chile and won by the Brazil national basketball team.  8 teams competed.

Results

References
FIBA Archive

1958
1958 in basketball
International basketball competitions hosted by Chile
1958 in Chilean sport 
Champ
Sports competitions in Santiago
1950s in Santiago, Chile
January 1958 sports events in South America
February 1958 sports events in South America